San Manuel Junior/Senior High School is a combined junior high and high school in San Manuel, Arizona. It, along with First Avenue and Mammoth elementary schools, comprises the Mammoth-San Manuel Unified School District.

References

Public high schools in Arizona
Schools in Pinal County, Arizona
Public middle schools in Arizona